Sir Thomas Cotton, 2nd Baronet, of Conington (1594 – 13 May 1662) was an English politician and heir to the Cottonian Library.

Life
He was the only surviving child of Sir Robert Cotton, 1st Baronet, of Connington and Elizabeth Brocas. He graduated B.A. at Broadgates Hall, Oxford in 1616. In 1624 he became Member of Parliament for Great Marlow.

Sir Thomas was the intimate friend and correspondent of Sir John Eliot, and was entrusted by his influence with the representation of St Germans (Eliot's native place) in the third of Charles I's parliaments. He was M.P. for Huntingdonshire in the Short Parliament of 1640, but took no active part in politics or the civil wars. His house at Westminster was left at the disposal of the parliament, and Charles I slept there during his trial. Cotton died at Conington on 13 May 1662, and was buried with his father.

Cottonian Library

He made great efforts for the restitution of his father's library, which later became the nucleus of the British Library. On 23 July 1631, the council ordered the catalogue to be continued; but in September Sir Thomas announced that it had been again interrupted, and begged to be allowed to retain possession of the books. This request was ultimately granted, although the date is uncertain.

Like his father, Sir Thomas gave scholars free access to his library. William Dugdale from an early age was often there, and obtained there much of his material for his Monasticon. In 1640 Sir Thomas lent his father's collection of coins to Sir Symonds D'Ewes. He moved the greater part of the library in 1650 to a villa at Stratton, Bedfordshire, which belonged to his son's wife.

Family
He married, first, Margaret, daughter of Lord William Howard, of Naworth Castle, Cumberland, by whom he had one son, John; second, Alice, daughter and heiress of Sir John Constable of Dromanby, Yorkshire, widow of Edmund Anderson of Stratton and Eyworth, Bedfordshire, by whom he had four sons. The second son, Robert, was Member of Parliament for Cambridgeshire, was knighted, was commissioner of the post office, and was friendly with John Evelyn.

References

Notes

Attribution

 
 
 

1594 births
1662 deaths
Baronets in the Baronetage of England
Members of the pre-1707 English Parliament for constituencies in Cornwall
English MPs 1624–1625
English MPs 1628–1629
English MPs 1640 (April)
Alumni of Broadgates Hall, Oxford